Morris Jesup Glacier (is a glacier in northwestern Greenland.  Administratively it belongs to the Avannaata municipality.

This glacier was named by Robert Peary after American industrialist-philanthropist Morris K. Jesup, president of the Peary Arctic Club, who helped finance Peary's expeditions.

Geography 
The Morris Jesup Glacier discharges from the Greenland Ice Sheet at the head of an unnamed fjord located just to the north of Cape Robertson in the Smith Sound area. The glacier flows roughly from NE to SW. The Diebitsch Glacier is located to the northwest, beyond Cape Saumarez, and Siorapaluup Kangerlua to the southeast, around Cape Robertson.

See also
List of glaciers in Greenland

References

External links
Earthquake Archive: past quakes in or near Morris Jesup Gletscher
Identifying Spatial Variability in Greenland's Outlet Glacier Response to Ocean Heat
Seasonal ice-speed variations in 10 marine-terminating outlet glaciers along the coast of Prudhoe Land, northwestern Greenland 
Glaciers of Greenland